Deependra Pandey (born 11 December 1985) is an Indian cricketer. He made his Twenty20 debut for Uttar Pradesh in the 2016–17 Inter State Twenty-20 Tournament on 3 February 2017. He made his List A debut for Uttar Pradesh in the 2016–17 Vijay Hazare Trophy on 4 March 2017.

References

External links
 

1985 births
Living people
Indian cricketers
Uttar Pradesh cricketers
Cricketers from Lucknow